The Colorado Mammoth are a lacrosse team based in Denver, Colorado playing in the National Lacrosse League (NLL). The 2020 season is the 34th in franchise history and 18th as the Mammoth (previously the Washington Power, Pittsburgh Crossefire, and Baltimore Thunder). Due to the COVID-19 pandemic, the season was suspended on March 12, 2020. On April 8, the league made a further public statement announcing the cancellation of the remaining games of the 2020 season and that they would be exploring options for playoffs once it was safe to resume play.

Final standings

Regular season

Cancelled games

Roster

See also
2020 NLL season

References

Colorado
Colorado Mammoth seasons
Colorado Mammoth